Frederic Adamou Ngove (born August 1, 1988, in Bertoua) is a professional Cameroonian  footballer currently playing for Union Sportive de Douala.

Career
He began his career with Bebe F.C. Douala and moved in 2000 to Cotonsport Garoua. In 2008, he left Garoua and moved to ES Hammam-Sousse.

External links
Profile and Pictures - www.cotonsport.com

1988 births
Living people
Cameroonian footballers
Coton Sport FC de Garoua players
ES Hammam-Sousse players
Association football midfielders